James Ivory Thaxton (born January 11, 1949) is a former American football tight end who played five seasons in the National Football League with the San Diego Chargers, Cleveland Browns, New Orleans Saints and St. Louis Cardinals. He was drafted by the Chargers in the fourth round of the 1973 NFL Draft. He played college football at Tennessee State University and attended Carver High School in Memphis, Tennessee.

References

External links
Just Sports Stats

Living people
1949 births
Players of American football from Tennessee
American football tight ends
African-American players of American football
Tennessee State Tigers football players
San Diego Chargers players
Cleveland Browns players
New Orleans Saints players
St. Louis Cardinals (football) players
People from Brownsville, Tennessee
Alumni of George Washington Carver High School (Memphis, Tennessee)
21st-century African-American people
20th-century African-American sportspeople